Graziella Moretto Figueiredo (born 15 May 1972) is a Brazilian former actress.

She has acted in some motion pictures, such as Fernando Meirelles' City of God, and some TV shows.

References 

1972 births
Living people
People from Santos, São Paulo
Brazilian film actresses
Brazilian telenovela actresses
Brazilian people of Italian descent